The Thác Mơ Hydroelectric Power Plant is a power plant on the Bé River in Đức Hạnh commune of Bù Gia Mập District, Bình Phước Province, Vietnam.

References

Hydroelectric power stations in Vietnam
Energy infrastructure completed in 1994
Buildings and structures in Bình Phước province
Dams in Vietnam